The 2022 Kansas Jayhawks football team represented the University of Kansas in the 2022 NCAA Division I FBS football season. It was the Jayhawks 133rd season. The Jayhawks played their home games at David Booth Kansas Memorial Stadium in Lawrence, Kansas, and competed in the Big 12 Conference. They were led by second-year head coach Lance Leipold. The Jayhawks finished the season 6–7 overall and 3–6 in the Big 12. They qualified for the 2022 Liberty Bowl where they lost to Arkansas.

Season summary
The Jayhawks won their first two games to start the season 2–0 for the first time since 2011. With a win over West Virginia on September 10, the Jayhawks had their first conference opening victory since they defeated Iowa State in 2009. The following week after defeating Houston, the Jayhawks began the season with a 3–0 record, which is their best start since the 2009 season. In the poll released on September 18, the Jayhawks received votes to be ranked for the first time since the 2009 season. Following career highs in yards (324) and passing touchdowns (4) against Duke on September 23,  some websites began calling junior quarterback Jalon Daniels a candidate for the Heisman Trophy. However, two weeks later he suffered a shoulder injury. The injury was initially reported as season ending, but Daniels denied the report. The Jayhawks' victory over Iowa State on October 1 gave the Jayhawks their second conference victory. It was the first time Kansas won more than one conference game since 2008, and it is also the first time since 2009 that the Jayhawks have won five games in a row. That season was also the last time Kansas started 5–0. In the AP poll released on October 2, Kansas was ranked 19. It is the first time the Jayhawks have been ranked since 2009. After losing back-to-back games, the Jayhawks fell out of the rankings. After defeating Oklahoma State, the Jayhawks became bowl eligible for the first time since 2008. The victory also gave the Jayhawks their first victory over an AP Poll ranked team since 2010 and their first ever victory over a team ranked in the College Football Playoff poll since it was first released in 2014. The Jayhawks finished conference play with 3 conference victories, which was the most conference wins since 2008. The season was the first time Kansas did not finish last in the Big 12 since the 2014 season. The 8th place finish was the best the Jayhawks had finished since the Big 12 eliminated divisions after the 2010 season. They Jayhawks qualified for the 2022 Liberty Bowl but lost a 3 overtime game to Arkansas, 53–55.

Offseason

Coaching staff changes

Starters lost
Overall, the Jayhawks had 25 players run out of eligibility. Below are the starters from 2021 who have run out of eligibility. Starters are based on players who started the final game of the 2021 season. Sixteen of 25 starters, including special teams, will return.

Recruiting
The Jayhawks have 8 commitments for their 2021 recruiting class. Below is the breakdown. Rankings are as of May 18, 2022.

Overall class ranking

Highest rated recruit

|}

Notable transfers
Incoming

Outgoing

Big 12 media poll
The preseason poll was released on July 7, 2022. Kansas was picked last in the conference for the 12th consecutive season. First place votes are in parentheses.

Schedule

Roster

Coaching staff

Game summaries
Rankings from AP poll until after November 5, after which, all rankings are College Football Playoff.

Tennessee Tech

The Jayhawks hosted the Golden Eagles to open the season. After forcing a 3-and-out on defense to start the game, the Jayhawks only took 1:53 to score their first touchdown of the season. Following another 3-and-out from the defense, the Jayhawks would score again. Kansas would score 3 touchdowns before allowing one themselves. They would score 35 unanswered points before allowing another touchdown after the Jayhawks had pulled their starters out of the game. They would defeat Tennessee Tech 56-10 for their largest margin of victory since 2016 when they defeated Rhode Island 55–6.

at West Virginia

In the Jayhawks opening conference game, they began the game with a 14–0 deficit before scoring their first touchdown. West Virginia would respond with their own touchdown to take the 21–7 lead. Kansas would then go on a 35–10 run to take a 42–31 lead. The Mountaineers responded with a 11–0 run to tie the game and send it to overtime. The Jayhawks would strike first in overtime on offense. On the Mountaineers drive in overtime, Kansas cornerback Cobee Bryant intercepted J. T. Daniels pass and returned 86 yards for a touchdown to win 55–42. The win gave the Jayhawks a 2–0 record for the first time since 2011 and gave KU their first conference opener win since 2009.

at Houston

In the Jayhawks first game against future Big 12 Conference opponent Houston since the 2005 Fort Worth Bowl, the Jayhawks began the game with a 14–0 deficit. The Jayhawks quickly rallied back, however, scoring 28 unanswered points to go into halftime 28–14. A lightning delay in the 2nd quarter caused halftime to be shortened to 15 minutes. Houston would go on a 10 play, 4:23 long drive for a touchdown to cut the lead to 28–21, but after a 6 minute, 75 yard drive for a touchdown the Kansas defense would force a turnover, a strip sack on Houston quarterback Clayton Tune, and on the ensuing drive the Jayhawks offense would put Kansas back up 42–21. Two Jacob Borcila field goals would field goals would put Kansas up by 18 late in the game, 48–30, giving Kansas their first back-to-back road victories since 2007, and their first 3–0 start since 2009.

Duke

In a battle of unbeaten teams more known for their basketball programs, the Jayhawks took the early lead in front of their capacity sellout crowd. The teams would trade touchdowns including a 73-yard touchdown reception from Daniel Hishaw Jr., who would break multiple tackles on his way to the end zone. The Jayhawks would never trail in the game. Despite a late score from Duke, Kansas held on to win 35–27. Kansas quarterback Jalon Daniels would set career highs with 324 passing yards and 4 touchdowns with only 4 incompletions. The win moved Kansas to 4–0 for the first time since 2009 and would make them two wins away from being bowl eligible for the first time since 2008.

Iowa State

The Jayhawks faced the Cyclones in what would prove to be a defensive battle. The Jayhawks held the Cyclones to only 11 points, their lowest point total allowed in a conference game since 2018. The Jayhawks were held to their lowest point total of the season as quarterback Jalon Daniels, who entered the game considered a Heisman Trophy candidate, was held to only 93 yards. Kansas started the game up 14–0 before allowing 11 unanswered points. Iowa State kicker Jace Gilbert missed 3 field goals, including a potential game-tying field goal with only 27 seconds left in the game. The win moved the Jayhawks to a 5–0 record and gave the Jayhawks their second conference victory, their first time winning more than a single conference game since 2008. The game would be the final game in a stretch of 151 consecutive games the Jayhawks would play as unranked team.

No. 17 TCU

Kansas was featured on ESPN's College GameDay for the first time since 2007 and hosted for the first time ever in their first game as a ranked team since 2009. TCU would start with a 10–0 lead. Late in the 2nd quarter on a drive that led to a field goal, Jayhawks' starting quarterback Jalon Daniels injured his shoulder. He would not return to the game. In the 3rd quarter, both teams would combine for 42 points as TCU would take a 31–24 lead into the fourth quarter. TCU would score what would prove to be the game-winning touchdown with 1:36 left in the game as the Jayhawks suffered their first loss of the season. The loss moved the Jayhawks losing streak against teams ranked in the AP poll to 45.

at Oklahoma

The game began as a shootout, with both teams trading touchdowns for the first 15 minutes of the game. After that, Oklahoma would score 21 unanswered points to take a 35–14 lead. The Jayhawks would score a touchdown shortly before the half. The Jayhawks and Sooners would trade touchdowns in the 2nd half before Oklahoma was held to a field goal. The Jayhawks responded with a touchdown but failed to recover the onside kick as the Jayhawks would lose their second consecutive game after starting 5–0. The Jayhawks gave up 701 yards and 51 points to the Sooners in a game where the final score depicted the game being closer than it actually was.

at Baylor

The Jayhawks got into an early 28–3 due to a bad punt, a turnover, and poor play defensively. The Jayhawks would go on a 20–0 run to make the game 28–23 with 6:29 left in the game. Baylor would score with 2:39 left ending the Jayhawks comeback bid. The loss would be the 3rd straight for Kansas as KU would fail to win their 6th game for bowl eligibility.

No. 18 Oklahoma State

The Jayhawks jumped out to a 31–7 lead in the game early in the 3rd quarter. Oklahoma State would score a field goal and touchdown but missed a two point conversion attempt to make it 34–16. KU would finish with another field goal. The victory was the Jayhawks first win over a AP ranked team since 2010, the first win by KU over OSU since 2007, and the first win by KU over OSU at home since 1994. It was also their largest victory over a ranked team since they defeated 15th ranked Oklahoma 38–17 in 1995. The win made Kansas bowl eligible for the first time since 2008.

at Texas Tech

The Jayhawks had an early 24–7 hole. They would make the game 27–21 by halftime. However, Kansas kicker Jacob Borcilla missed two field goals, 1 in the first quarter and 1 in the 3rd, that would have made the game tied at 27–27. Kansas wouldn't be able to complete the comeback, losing 43–28.

Texas

Kansas quarterback Jalon Daniels returned after missing the previous 6 games due to a shoulder injury. However, the Jayhawks struggling defense failed to stop Texas running back Bijan Robinson who would score 4 touchdowns. The Jayhawks wouldn't score until late in the 3rd quarter after allowing 45 unanswered points. The Jayhawks allowed 539 yards on defense, their 3rd game allowing over 500 yards and their 8th time (6th consecutive game) allowing over 400 yards.

at No. 12 Kansas State

In the 120th edition of the Sunflower Showdown, the Jayhawks made the 80 mile trip to Manhattan. K-State and KU traded touchdowns on their first drives. However, after a short kick return, a penalty on the kickoff return, and a holding penalty in the endzone, the Jayhawks gave up a safety. K-State would score on the next drive to go up 23–7. The Jayhawks wouldn't come within a touchdown of the Wildcats the rest of the game and would lose their 14th straight game against their in-state rival.

vs Arkansas

In the Jayhawks first bowl game in 14 years, they scored the first touchdown of the game. That would be the Jayhawks only lead in regulation However, multiple turnovers would get the Jayhawks into a 31–7 hole late in the first half. The Jayhawks would finish regulation on a 31–7 run themselves to send the game into overtime led by a successful onside kick. The Jayhawks fell short in overtime and would lose the game 53–55. Daniels broke the school record for passing yards in a game with 544.

Rankings

Season Honors
1st Team All-Big 12
 DB Cobee Bryant

2nd Team All-Big 12
 QB Jalon Daniels
 TE Mason Fairchild
 OL Mike Novitsky
 DL Lonnie Phelps

Honorable Mention All-Big 12
 RB Devin Neal
 OL Earl Bostick
 DL Dominick Puni
 DB Kenny Logan

References

Kansas
Kansas Jayhawks football seasons
Kansas Jayhawks football